Harold William Attridge (born November 24, 1946) is an American New Testament scholar known for his work in New Testament exegesis, especially the Epistle to the Hebrews, the study of Hellenistic Judaism, and the history of the early Church. He is a Sterling Professor of Divinity at Yale University, where he served as Dean of the Divinity School from 2002 to 2012, the first Catholic to head that historically Protestant school.

Education and career 
Attridge received a Bachelor of Arts degree from Boston College (1967), Bachelor of Arts and Master of Arts degrees from the University of Cambridge (1969, 1973), which he attended as a Marshall Scholar, and a Doctor of Philosophy degree from Harvard University (1974). He also studied at Hebrew University of Jerusalem in 1972–73.

After a three-year term in the Harvard Society of Fellows, Attridge taught at Perkins School of Theology at Southern Methodist University (1977–1985) and the University of Notre Dame (1985–1997), where he also served as the Dean of the College of Arts and Letters. In 1997 he moved to Yale Divinity School, where he was named the Lillian Claus Professor of New Testament. He was Dean of the Divinity School from 2002 to 2012 before returning to teaching as a Sterling Professor.

Attridge was president of the Society of Biblical Literature in 2001 and of the Catholic Biblical Association in 2011–2012. He serves on multiple editorial boards and was a fellow of the Jesus Seminar. In 2015, he was elected to the American Academy of Arts & Sciences. Yale Divinity School has established a named scholarship fund in honor of Attridge and his wife, Janice.

Selected works

Books

Edited by

Chapters

References

External links 
Yale Faculty webpage

Works by or about Harold W. Attridge in Index Theologicus

1946 births
20th-century American male writers
20th-century American non-fiction writers
20th-century Christian biblical scholars
20th-century Roman Catholics
21st-century American male writers
21st-century American non-fiction writers
21st-century Christian biblical scholars
21st-century Roman Catholics
Alumni of the University of Cambridge
American biblical scholars
Boston College alumni
Harvard Divinity School alumni
Harvard Fellows
Living people
Marshall Scholars
Members of the Jesus Seminar
New Testament scholars
Roman Catholic biblical scholars
Southern Methodist University faculty
University of Notre Dame faculty
Yale Divinity School faculty
Yale Sterling Professors
Fellows of the American Academy of Arts and Sciences